The Marx Memorial Library in London, United Kingdom is a library, archive, educational, and community outreach charity focused on Marxist and wider socialist bodies of work. England and Wales charity number: 270309.

Its collection comprises over 60,000 books, pamphlets, items, and newspapers on Marxism, socialism, and working class history.  It is currently located in a Grade II listed building along Clerkenwell Green.

Overview
The library opened in 1933 at 37a Clerkenwell Green, formerly home to many radical organisations, and base of an important publishing operation. The building was built as the Welsh Charity School between 1737-8. The front elevation of the building was rebuilt between 1968 and 1969.

The Library now also houses "The Printers Collection" consisting of the archives of the printing and papermaking unions of the UK and Ireland. The collection includes union documents, magazines, photographs, badges and memorabilia. The archive was opened in March 2009 by Derek Simpson Joint General Secretary of Unite and Tony Burke, Assistant General Secretary of Unite.

History

18th century 
The building now occupied by the library was originally built in 1738 to house the Welsh Charity School. It was designed by James Steer, and the construction funded by subscriptions. The school moved out to a new home in Gray's Inn Lane (now Gray's Inn Road) in 1772. The building subsequently became (in part) a public house, the Northumberland Arms; and was put to other commercial uses.

19th century 
Part of it was occupied from 1872 onwards by the radical London Patriotic Society; and from 1893 (with the financial backing of William Morris) by the Twentieth Century Press Ltd, publishers of Justice, the newspaper of the Social Democratic Federation.

20th century 
The Press expanded to take over the whole building in 1908–9, and remained until 1922. It was during this period, in 1902–3, that the exiled V. I. Lenin worked in the building, publishing seventeen issues of his newspaper Iskra (Spark) from here. The office he allegedly used is preserved as a memorial to him, although this room did not in fact exist at the time he was there: however, he may have worked in an earlier office partly on its site.

Following a further period of commercial use, the Marx Memorial Library occupied part of the building in 1933, eventually taking over the whole.

The library features the fresco The worker of the future upsetting the economic chaos of the present, painted by Jack Hastings in 1935 with the assistance of the American artist, Clifford Wight.

Through these changes of use, the fabric had undergone numerous alterations and dilapidations, and in 1968–69 the building underwent a major programme of work to restore the 18th-century appearance of the front. The necessary interventions and reconstructions were so drastic that the result is described by the Survey of London as "a modern quasifacsimile – of the original only the outer quoins can have survived".

The library building was listed Grade II on the National Heritage List for England in September 1972.

Collection
As of 2021, over 60,000 items are held by the library. Holdings include the first edition of The Red Republican (1850), the Votes for Women suffragette newspaper, and other socialist publications.

Governance 
The first president of the library in 1933 was Alex Gossip, president of the Socialist Sunday Schools.

Journal 
The library publishes an annual journal, Theory & Struggle, published by Liverpool University Press. Its current editor (2021) is Marjorie Mayo.

References

Bibliography

External links

1933 establishments in the United Kingdom
Archives in the London Borough of Islington
British digital libraries
Buildings and structures in Clerkenwell
Charities based in London
Grade II listed buildings in the London Borough of Islington
Libraries established in 1933
Libraries in the London Borough of Islington
Literary archives in London
Research libraries in the United Kingdom
School buildings completed in 1738
Socialist organisations in the United Kingdom
Socialist organizations